The 2001 Louisiana Tech Bulldogs football team represented Louisiana Tech University as a member of the Western Athletic Conference (WAC) during the 2001 NCAA Division I-A football season. Led by third-year head coach Jack Bicknell Jr., the Bulldogs played their home games at Joe Aillet Stadium in Ruston, Louisiana. Louisiana Tech finished the season with a record of 7–5 overall and a mark of 7–1 in conference play, winning the WAC title. They were invited to the Humanitarian Bowl, where they lost to Clemson.

Schedule

References

Louisiana Tech
Louisiana Tech Bulldogs football seasons
Western Athletic Conference football champion seasons
Louisiana Tech Bulldogs football